The End of the World Is Just the Beginning: Mapping the Collapse of Globalization is a nonfiction book written by Peter Zeihan, a geopolitical strategist who formerly worked for the geopolitical intelligence firm Stratfor.  The book was published by Harper Business in June 2022.

Background 
What is currently referred to as deglobalization has been the focus of much of the author's research since 2012, when he left Stratfor and founded his own consulting firm.

Summary 
This book's analysis covers six different economic sectors:

 Agriculture
 Energy
 Finance
 Manufacturing
 Materials
 Transport

Within each of the above sectors, the author investigates the prospects for a number of developed nations.  Very often there are some relations or correlations between the prospects of a country across the six sectors.  If a country is anticipated to do well in one sector, it is often likely to do well in several other sectors as well.

For instance, across all sectors, he expects the US to fare relatively well.  It has an extensive network of maritime transportation across very favorable waterways, including optimal access to the Atlantic and Pacific oceans.  It has the deepest and best integrated capital markets.  Because of the shale oil revolution, it has become increasingly independent regarding its energy needs.  And, it has a large, dependably productive agricultural sector, being a major food exporter, due to a favorable climate and abundant fertile lands.

On the other hand, the author is less enthusiastic about the prospects for both China and Russia across several of the mentioned sectors. They both suffer from an ageing demographic profile, less than optimal transportation waterways network, and their respective capital markets are not nearly as deep and integrated as the US (in part due to global sanctions against Russia, and a closed capital market in China).  Additionally, China imports much of its petroleum and food requirements. In a deglobalized world, both countries will face major challenges on several fronts, according to the author.

Similarly, Europe will face several challenges of its own including ageing demographics, energy dependence vulnerability, and lack of access to domestic industrial raw materials.  Africa and India will have numerous problems, including the most existential one, the ability to feed their citizens.

Analytical framework 

 Demography.  The book examines age pyramids, a country's population aging over time and into the future. This gives him a view of a country's prospect for its labor force growth or contraction over time. In turn, this informs him on the overall economic prospects of a country in terms of economic growth, rising living standards, and other indices.  
 Geography.  The book has a particular focus on access to oceans and internal waterways (rivers), as he considers that water transport is by far the cheapest (relative to air transport, rail transport, highway transport); and, therefore, such waterways can provide a material competitive advantage in economics and trade, both domestic and international.  
 History. Since the end of the Second World War, the United States has supported a safe and secure maritime world trading system by patrolling the global seas with the world's most powerful navy. As the US commitment to safeguarding this maritime world trading system wanes, this has the potential to disrupt world trade. He expects the US to fare reasonably well in this deglobalized world, and most other countries and regions to not fare as well.

Outlook 
The book envisions the outlook for specific countries or regions, within the listed sectors (transport, finance, etc.)  Across most sectors, it anticipates major challenges. it asserts that the period from the 1950s to the 2020s represented a peak period of rapid economic development and innovation; meanwhile, the present (2022) and future would be associated with a rather abrupt slowing of such developments. In this view, deglobalization leads to deindustrialization, deurbanization, and even depopulation.

Quotes

Agriculture and climate change 
Zeihan believes that climate change is a major driver affecting the prospects of countries and regions. The book examinies numerous consequences  of a heating planet, including not only rising temperature but changes in humidity, precipitation, winds, and regional climatic volatility. He then reviews these  consequences' impact on agriculture. As a case-study example he contrasts the prospects for Australia as compared to the prospects for the US state of Illinois. Both face a similar rise in temperature in the 21st century. Because Illinois has, as of 2022, a more temperate, more humid, and less volatile climate, it should, the book claims, experience a net agricultural benefit from climate change, with its agricultural sector likely to become more productive. Australia, with an already hotter, drier, and more volatile climate, is expected to experience a decline in its agricultural sector as a result of climate change.

He extends this reasoning to the entire planet, which leads him to conclude that much of the Earth, including areas of major agricultural production, will be negatively affected by climate change. He states, "Conservatively, that adds climatic challenges to the agricultural production zones feeding some 4 billion people."

Reception 
The book debuted at number 12 on The New York Times nonfiction best-seller list for the week ending June 18, 2022.

Kirkus Reviews acknowledged the book's points, but regarded its forecast as excessively pessimistic:

 

An early analysis of the book by Liam Denning, from Bloomberg, published in The Washington Post was positive.

References

External links 
 Peter Zeihan
 End of the World maps

2022 non-fiction books
HarperCollins books
Books about geopolitics